In mathematics, the Birch and Swinnerton-Dyer conjecture (often called the Birch–Swinnerton-Dyer conjecture) describes the set of rational solutions to equations defining an elliptic curve. It is an open problem in the field of number theory and is widely recognized as one of the most challenging mathematical problems. It is named after mathematicians Bryan John Birch and Peter Swinnerton-Dyer, who developed the conjecture during the first half of the 1960s with the help of machine computation. , only special cases of the conjecture have been proven.

The modern formulation of the conjecture relates arithmetic data associated with an elliptic curve E over a number field K to the behaviour of the Hasse–Weil L-function L(E, s) of E at s = 1. More specifically, it is conjectured that the rank of the abelian group E(K) of points of E is the order of the zero of L(E, s) at s = 1, and the first non-zero coefficient in the Taylor expansion of L(E, s) at s = 1 is given by more refined arithmetic data attached to E over K .

The conjecture was chosen as one of the seven Millennium Prize Problems listed by the Clay Mathematics Institute, which has offered a $1,000,000 prize for the first correct proof.

Background 
 proved Mordell's theorem: the group of rational points on an elliptic curve has a finite basis. This means that for any elliptic curve there is a finite subset of the rational points on the curve, from which all further rational points may be generated.

If the number of rational points on a curve is infinite then some point in a finite basis must have infinite order. The number of independent basis points with infinite order is called the rank of the curve, and is an important invariant property of an elliptic curve.

If the rank of an elliptic curve is 0, then the curve has only a finite number of rational points. On the other hand, if the rank of the curve is greater than 0, then the curve has an infinite number of rational points.

Although Mordell's theorem shows that the rank of an elliptic curve is always finite, it does not give an effective method for calculating the rank of every curve. The rank of certain elliptic curves can be calculated using numerical methods but (in the current state of knowledge) it is unknown if these methods handle all curves.

An L-function L(E, s) can be defined for an elliptic curve E by constructing an Euler product from the number of points on the curve modulo each prime p. This L-function is analogous to the Riemann zeta function and the Dirichlet L-series that is defined for a binary quadratic form. It is a special case of a Hasse–Weil L-function.

The natural definition of L(E, s) only converges for values of s in the complex plane with Re(s) > 3/2. Helmut Hasse conjectured that L(E, s) could be extended by analytic continuation to the whole complex plane. It was subsequently shown to be true for all elliptic curves over Q, as a consequence of the modularity theorem in 2001.

Finding rational points on a general elliptic curve is a difficult problem. Finding the points on an elliptic curve modulo a given prime p is conceptually straightforward, as there are only a finite number of possibilities to check. However, for large primes it is computationally intensive.

History 

In the early 1960s Peter Swinnerton-Dyer used the EDSAC-2 computer at the University of Cambridge Computer Laboratory to calculate the number of points modulo p (denoted by Np) for a large number of primes p on elliptic curves whose rank was known. From these numerical results  conjectured that Np for a curve E with rank r obeys an asymptotic law

where C is a constant.

Initially this was based on somewhat tenuous trends in graphical plots; this induced a measure of skepticism in J. W. S. Cassels (Birch's Ph.D. advisor). Over time the numerical evidence stacked up.

This in turn led them to make a general conjecture about the behaviour of a curve's L-function L(E, s) at s = 1, namely that it would have a zero of order r at this point. This was a far-sighted conjecture for the time, given that the analytic continuation of L(E, s) there was only established for curves with complex multiplication, which were also the main source of numerical examples. (NB that the reciprocal of the L-function is from some points of view a more natural object of study; on occasion this means that one should consider poles rather than zeroes.)

The conjecture was subsequently extended to include the prediction of the precise leading Taylor coefficient of the L-function at s = 1. It is conjecturally given by

where the quantities on the right hand side are invariants of the curve, studied by Cassels, Tate, Shafarevich and others : 

 is the order of the torsion group, 

 is the order of the Tate–Shafarevich group, 

 is the real period of E multiplied by the number of connected components of E,

 is the regulator of E which is defined via the canonical heights of a basis of rational points,

 is the Tamagawa number of E at a prime p dividing the conductor N of E. It can be found by Tate's algorithm.

Current status 

The Birch and Swinnerton-Dyer conjecture has been proved only in special cases:

  proved that if E is a curve over a number field F with complex multiplication by an imaginary quadratic field K of class number 1, F = K or Q, and L(E, 1) is not 0 then  E(F) is a finite group.
  showed that if a modular elliptic curve has a first-order zero at s = 1 then it has a rational point of infinite order; see Gross–Zagier theorem.
 showed that a modular elliptic curve E for which L(E, 1) is not zero has rank 0, and a modular elliptic curve E for which L(E, 1) has a first-order zero at s = 1 has rank 1.
  showed that for elliptic curves defined over an imaginary quadratic field K with complex multiplication by K, if the L-series of the elliptic curve was not zero at s = 1, then the p-part of the Tate–Shafarevich group had the order predicted by the Birch and Swinnerton-Dyer conjecture, for all primes p > 7.
  proved that the average rank of the Mordell–Weil group of an elliptic curve over Q is bounded above by 7/6.

There are currently no proofs involving curves with rank greater than 1.

There is extensive numerical evidence for the truth of the conjecture.

Consequences 
Much like the Riemann hypothesis, this conjecture has multiple consequences, including the following two:
 Let  be an odd square-free integer. Assuming the Birch and Swinnerton-Dyer conjecture,  is the area of a right triangle with rational side lengths (a congruent number) if and only if the number of triplets of integers satisfying  is twice the number of triplets satisfying . This statement, due to Tunnell's theorem , is related to the fact that n is a congruent number if and only if the elliptic curve  has a rational point of infinite order (thus, under the Birch and Swinnerton-Dyer conjecture, its -function has a zero at ). The interest in this statement is that the condition is easily verified.
In a different direction, certain analytic methods allow for an estimation of the order of zero in the center of the critical strip of families of L-functions. Admitting the BSD conjecture, these estimations correspond to information about the rank of families of elliptic curves in question.

Notes

References

External links 

 The Birch and Swinnerton-Dyer Conjecture: An Interview with Professor Henri Darmon by Agnes F. Beaudry
 What is the Birch and Swinnerton-Dyer Conjecture? lecture by Manjul Bhargava (september 2016) given during the Clay Research Conference held at the University of Oxford

Conjectures
Diophantine geometry
Millennium Prize Problems
Number theory
University of Cambridge Computer Laboratory
Zeta and L-functions